The Trainspotting soundtracks''' are two soundtrack albums released following the film adaptation of Irvine Welsh's novel of the same name.

The first album was released in February 1996 in the UK and 9 July 1996 in the US. The comparatively huge fanbase for both the film and the original soundtrack prompted a release of a second soundtrack on 21 October 1997. This second album included songs from the film that didn't make the cut for the first album, as well as songs that didn't appear in the final film, but were involved at earlier stages or were used as inspiration by the filmmakers, and one duplicate song. The popularity of the first volume led EMI to reissue and continue to press it from 16 June 2003.

In 2007 the editors of Vanity Fair magazine ranked the original Trainspotting soundtrack as the 7th best motion picture soundtrack in history. It was ranked #17 on Entertainment Weeklys 100 Best Movie Soundtracks.

Track listing
Trainspotting: Music from the Motion Picture

Certifications

Trainspotting #2: Music from the Motion Picture, Vol. #2

Certifications

Recognition
2001: Ranked #17 on Entertainment Weekly's 100 Best Movie Soundtracks.
2007: Editors of Vanity Fair magazine ranked the original Trainspotting soundtrack as the 7th best motion picture soundtrack in history.
2013: Ranked #13 in Rolling Stone's "The 25 Greatest Soundtracks of All Time"

Complete film soundtrack
The following is a complete list of songs that appear in the film Trainspotting in order of appearance:

"Lust for Life" – Iggy Pop
"Carmen Suite No.2" – Georges Bizet
"Deep Blue Day" – Brian Eno
"Trainspotting" – Primal Scream
"Temptation"^ – Heaven 17
"Atomic" – Sleeper
"Temptation"^ – New Order
"Nightclubbing" – Iggy Pop
"Sing" – Blur
"Perfect Day" – Lou Reed
"Dark and Long (Dark Train)" – Underworld
"Think About the Way" – Ice MC
"Mile End" – Pulp
"For What You Dream Of" (Full On Renaissance Mix) – Bedrock featuring KYO
"2:1" – Elastica
"Herzlich Tut Mich Verlangen" – Gábor Lehotka
"A Final Hit" – Leftfield
"Statuesque" – Sleeper
"Born Slippy .NUXX" – Underworld
"Closet Romantic" – Damon Albarn

^Two songs titled 'Temptation' feature in the movie and soundtracks 1 & 2, however they are completely different songs.

See also
T2 Trainspotting soundtrack

References

External links
 
 
 "Trainspotting (1996) – The 25 Greatest Soundtracks of All Time" on Rolling Stone "The Trainspotting Soundtrack is a Timeless Classic" on Sabotage Times''

Trainspotting Soundtrack
Trainspotting #2 Soundtrack
Comedy film soundtracks
Trainspotting

he:טריינספוטינג (סרט)#פסקול